The 13th ALMA Awards honors the accomplishments made by Hispanics in film, television, and music in 2011.  The awards were taped on September 16, 2012 at the Pasadena Civic Auditorium for broadcast on NBC on September 21, 2012. The show was co-hosted by Eva Longoria and George Lopez, marking their third consecutive year as hosts. The awards ceremony was sponsored by the National Council of La Raza.

The winners were chosen based on online voting, box office figures, Nielsen and Billboard rankings, and Comedy..l of the NCLR ALMA Awards production leadership team.

Jennifer Lopez had nominations in all three media formats: Favorite Movie Actress Comedy/Musical; Favorite TV Reality, Variety, or Comedy Personality or Act; and Favorite Female Music Artist. Naya Rivera won both of her nominations: Favorite Female Music Artist and Favorite TV Actress Comedy.  The film Savages had four overall nominations in the Favorite Acting categories, while the films The Way and Cristiada (For Greater Glory) had three overall nominations, including Favorite Movie, which was won by triple-nominee Girl in Progress.

The ceremony aired on NBC for the second consecutive and last year before moving to sister channel MSNBC.

Winners and nominees

The following is a list of the 65 nominees from film, television, and music. Winners are listed first and highlighted in bold:

Honorary awards
Henry Darrow received the Ricardo Montalban Lifetime Achievement Award.
Cheech Marin received an award for Outstanding Career Achievement.
Christina Aguilera was given a Special Achievement Award for her career and philanthropic work.

Film

Television

Music

Televised ceremony ratings
The ceremony, which was televised by NBC on September 21, 2012, was watched by 2.41 million viewers.

References

External links
Official website for the ALMA awards

013
2012 awards
Latin American film awards